Thalattoarchon is an extinct genus of ichthyosaur from the Middle Triassic of the western United States. The type species Thalattoarchon saurophagis (meaning "lizard-eating sovereign of the sea" in Greek) was discovered in Nevada, USA, in 2010 and formally described in 2013. It is known from a single skeleton, holotype FMNH PR 3032, consisting of a partial skull, vertebral column, hip bones, and parts of the hind fins. The total length of Thalattoarchon is estimated to have been at least . Thalattoarchon is thought to have been one of the first marine macropredators capable of eating prey that was similar in size to itself, an ecological role that can be compared to that of modern orcas. Thalattoarchon lived four million years after the first appearance of ichthyosaurs in the Early Triassic and is therefore the oldest known marine reptile to have been an apex predator. It lived eight million years after the Permian-Triassic extinction event, indicating a fast recovery of marine ecosystems after the mass extinction.

Description

The only known skeleton of Thalattoarchon is incomplete, but it can be inferred on the basis of other early ichthyosaurs to have had an elongated body and a weakly developed caudal fin. Thalattoarchon is diagnosed by a single distinguishing feature that is unique among ichthyosaurs: large, thin teeth that bear two cutting edges and that have smooth tooth crowns. Most later ichthyosaurs have much smaller cone-shaped teeth. The Late Triassic ichthyosaur Himalayasaurus tibetensis also has large teeth with cutting edges, but can be distinguished from Thalattoarchon saurophagis by the presence of grooves across the surfaces of its tooth crowns. Thalattoarchon is very similar in appearance to Cymbospondylus, another large-bodied Middle Triassic ichthyosaur, but differs in having a head that is about twice as large as that of Cymbospondylus relative to its body.

Classification
Below is a cladogram from Fröbisch et al. (2013):

A 2016 cladistic analysis recovers Thalattoarchon as a cymbospondylid rather than a basal merriamosaur.

See also
 List of ichthyosaurs
 Timeline of ichthyosaur research

References

Middle Triassic ichthyosaurs
Middle Triassic reptiles of North America
Triassic United States
Extinct reptiles
Ichthyosauromorph genera